The Street Manual Training School was a historic African American school in Richmond, Dallas County, Alabama. The remaining  campus contains seven buildings constructed between 1906 and 1964 as well as a circa 1943 water tower. The school was listed on the National Register of Historic Places on July 28, 1999.

School

The school was founded in 1904 by Emmanuel M. Brown.  Brown, a graduate of Snow Hill Normal and Industrial Institute and Harvard University, was a proponent of the ideas of Booker T. Washington.  He was dedicated to improving the quality of life for African Americans in Dallas County during the Jim Crow era of racial segregation.  Brown modeled his school on the Tuskegee Institute.  He lived onsite from the beginning of the school, serving as the headmaster until his death in 1960.

References

National Register of Historic Places in Dallas County, Alabama
School buildings on the National Register of Historic Places in Alabama
1904 establishments in Alabama
Schools in Dallas County, Alabama
Defunct schools in Alabama
African-American history of Alabama
Historically segregated African-American schools in Alabama